The men's singles of the 2021 I.ČLTK Prague Open tournament was played on clay in Prague, Czech Republic.

Stan Wawrinka was the defending champion but chose not to partake in this edition.

Tallon Griekspoor won the title after defeating Oscar Otte 5–7, 6–4, 6–4 in the final.

Seeds

Draw

Finals

Top half

Bottom half

References

External links
Main draw
Qualifying draw

I.ČLTK Prague Open - Men's 1
I.ČLTK Prague Open